The following is a list of international organization leaders in 2016.

UN organizations

Political and economic organizations

Financial organizations

Sports organizations

Other organizations

See also
List of state leaders in 2016
List of religious leaders in 2016
List of international organization leaders in 2015
List of international organization leaders in 2017

References 

2016
2016 in international relations
Lists of office-holders in 2016